Olivier Cadiot (born 1956) is a French writer, poet, dramatist and translator.

Cadiot was born in Paris. His first book of poems, L'Art poetic, in which he used the cut-up technique, was published in 1988. In 1993, Cadiot published Futur, ancient, fugitive, and in 1997 he published Le Colonel des zouaves. In these books he proposed novels as poems. In 1995 and 1996 he coedited the Revue de Littérature générale with Pierre Alféri.

Works
 L'art poétic, POL, Paris, 1988 
 Roméo & Juliette, POL, Paris, 1989 
 Futur, ancien, fugitif, POL, Paris, 1993 
 Le Colonel Des Zouaves, POL, Paris, 1997

See also

References
 Dictionnaire de la littérature française  C0090

External links
  Author page on the POL site
  Olivier Cadiot : « Tout roman est une proposition », Le Monde, 11 January 2007
  Cap au mieux: Interview by Olivier Cadiot, Vacarme, n° 45, autumn 2008.
Red, Green, & Black, English tr. by Charles Bernstein and Cadiot, 1990
Olivier Cadiot - France - Poetry International
Olivier Cadiot -Lavender Ink / Diálogos

20th-century French male writers
French poets
20th-century French dramatists and playwrights
1956 births
Writers from Paris
Living people
French male poets
French male dramatists and playwrights